Post Office Hill is a prominent hill in Antarctica, 430 m, standing 4 nautical miles (7 km) northwest of The Knoll and overlooking the Adelie penguin rookery of Cape Crozier, Ross Island. Mapped and so named by the New Zealand Geological Survey Antarctic Expedition (NZGSAE), 1958–59, because the ship Discovery, in January 1902, left messages attached to a pole in a cairn of rocks in the rookery for the relief ship Morning.

References

 

Hills of Ross Island